Frank Patrick Zinn (December 21, 1865 – May 12, 1936) was an American professional baseball catcher. He played two games in Major League Baseball in 1888 for the Philadelphia Athletics in the American Association.

Born in Phoenixville, Pennsylvania, he played his first game on April 18, 1888, and his final game on May 3, 1888. He was five-feet, eight-inches tall and weighed one-hundred fifty pounds. In seven at bats, he got no hits and one walk. He died at the age of 70 in Manayunk, Philadelphia.

Notes

References

External links

1865 births
1936 deaths
People from Phoenixville, Pennsylvania
Major League Baseball catchers
Philadelphia Athletics players
Williamsport Lumber Citys players
Hazleton (minor league baseball) players
Reading (minor league baseball) players
19th-century baseball players
Baseball players from Pennsylvania